MacAir Airlines Pty Ltd was a regional airline based in Townsville, Queensland, Australia. It operated scheduled passenger services throughout Queensland from major regional locations, as well as regular and ad hoc charters for the minerals industry in Queensland. Its main operations base was Townsville Airport, with hubs at Cairns, Brisbane and Mount Isa.

In January 2009, the airline was placed in receivership.

History
MacAir Airlines was established and started charter operations in 1992 as McKinlay Air Charters, adding scheduled services in 1998. In May 2000 the Collings family sold the airline to Transjet, owner of Transtate Airlines. The two brands were merged and operated under the MacAir name. In November 2003 MacAir acquired Horizon Airlines. MacAir Airlines grew to become a major player in Australia's regional aviation network and played an important role in providing transport to both passengers and freight throughout regional Queensland.

MacAir Airlines was based in Townsville. Staff were based in Townsville, Cairns, Mount Isa and Brisbane.

In 1998, the growth of the mining industry and MacAir Airlines' fly-in fly-out operations led to the expansion of the carrier and the introduction of passenger services in North Queensland. The year 2000 saw further expansion for MacAir when it merged with passenger airline Transtate Airlines and incorporated their Gulf of Carpentaria services under the MacAir banner.

The link between Townsville and Mount Isa was one of the busiest. Passenger volumes on this route serving the mining industry saw the company introduce its ATR 42-500 into service.

MacAir Airlines was a Qantas commercial partner. As such, the airline had worldwide distribution through the Qantas reservation system. This agreement between the two carriers gave passengers the ability to choose several options for booking tickets along with the ability to accrue and utilise frequent flyer points on a number of services.

On 29 January 2009, MacAir placed itself into voluntary administration; the following day major creditor Suncorp-Metway appointed Ernst & Young as receivers and the airline ceased operations. MacAir had previously asked the Government of Queensland for a $7 million one-off ex gratia payment, but the government refused, saying that MacAir had "systemic issues." On 6 February, the business was closed by the receiver and its 200 employees dismissed. The administrator wound up the business and sold off the company's assets; however the airline only owned a single aircraft as the others were all leased, as were the ground installations.

Destinations
At the end of January 2009 MacAir operated to the following scheduled destinations:

From Townsville to:
Mount Isa
Cloncurry
Winton
Longreach
Moranbah
Mackay
Emerald
Brisbane
Hughenden
Richmond
Julia Creek
From Cairns to:
Mount Isa
Normanton
Mornington
Burketown
Doomadgee
Pormpuraaw
Kowanyama
From Brisbane to:
Moranbah
Townsville
Oakley
St George
Cunnamulla
Thargomindah
Charleville
Quilpie
Birdsville
Bedourie
Boulia
Mount Isa

Charter connections for mining companies from Townsville to:
Osborne Mine Airport
Cannington Mine (BHP)
Century Airport (MMG)

Fleet
Over time the Macair Airlines fleet consisted of the following aircraft:

1 ATR 42-500
8 Fairchild SA227-DC Metro 23
7 Saab 340B (six second generation 340B and one third generation 340B+)
2 de Havilland Canada DHC-6 Twin Otter
 Cessna 208 Caravan
1 British Aerospace Jetstream 41

See also
List of defunct airlines of Australia

References

External links

Airlines established in 2000
Airlines disestablished in 2009
Defunct airlines of Australia
2000 establishments in Australia
2009 disestablishments in Australia